Francis Louis Barrallier (19 October 1773 – 11 June 1853) was a French-born explorer of Australia.

Life and career
Francis Barrallier was the eldest son of Jean-Louis Barrallier, a French marine engineer and Royalist supporter who escaped to the United Kingdom in 1793 during the Siege of Toulon by the Republicans. Francis arrived in Australia in April 1800 and in July 1800 the Governor of New South Wales, Philip Gidley King, appointed him as an ensign in the New South Wales Corps. He was made engineer and artillery officer in August 1801.

His first assignment was to design the Parramatta orphan asylum building. Barrallier's work on the maps of Jervis Bay, Western Port and some of Bass Strait were recognised by Governor Philip Gidley King, who made him engineer and artillery officer in the Corps.

In June a voyage with Grant was made to the Hunter River, where Barrallier made a survey of Coal Harbour (now Newcastle) and part of the river.

In October–November 1802 he was directed by Governor King to try to find a way over Blue Mountains to the west of Sydney. He travelled about 140 miles in seven weeks, but had to turn back – at one stage due to unfriendly Aborigines, and later due to a lack of supplies. 
He did not succeed in crossing the range. His finishing point was "towards the head of Christy's Creek, about 15 or 16 miles in a direct line southerly from Jenolan Caves".

In 1802, he was reputedly the first colonist to hear—at least mention hearing—the local Aboriginal people using the 'coo-ee' call, which was later also adopted by colonial settlers.

In the May 1803 he resigned from the New South Wales Corps and left for England. Other examples of his work in Sydney included the design of the fort on Observatory Hill (used as a signal station in the 1850s) and plans for the first vessel built in Sydney.

In 1805 he was appointed a lieutenant in the 90th Regiment. In 1806 he was at St Vincent, and in 1809 was present at the capture of the island of Martinique.

He was made a captain in 1812. He spent some years making a military survey of the island of Barbados, was present at the capture of Guadeloupe in 1814, and was appointed surveyor-general of the island. Barrallier returned to England in 1819. He died in London on 11 June 1853.

Barrallier Island in Western Port, Mount Barrallier in the Kanangra area of New South Wales, and the historical locality of Barrallier, New South Wales are named after him.

See also
 List of Blue Mountains articles

References

 

1773 births
1853 deaths
Explorers of Australia
People from the Blue Mountains (New South Wales)